Čardaklija is a village in the municipality of Štip, North Macedonia.

Demographics
According to the 2002 census, the village had a total of 922 inhabitants. Ethnic groups in the village include:

Macedonians 839
Turks 22
Serbs 2
Romani 10
Aromanians 41
Others 8

References

Villages in Štip Municipality